Doppler on Wheels (or DOW) is a fleet of X-band and C-band radar trucks managed by the University of Illinois Urbana-Champaign and previously maintained by the Center for Severe Weather Research (CSWR) in Boulder, Colorado, led by principal investigator (PI) Joshua Wurman, with the funding largely provided by the National Science Foundation (NSF). The DOW fleet and its associated Mobile Mesonets and deployable weather stations (Pods) were Lower Atmospheric Observing Facilities (LAOF) "National Facilities" supporting a wide variety NSF-sponsored research. They are now included in the NSF's "Community Instruments and Facilities" (CIF) program led by PI Karen Kosiba.

History and deployment 

As of 2022, there are three operational DOWs out of a total of eight constructed since 1995. Two of the three, DOWs 6 and 7, are dual-polarization, dual-frequency, quick-scanning Doppler weather radars. These radars have the highest transmitting power of any mobile X-band system with dual 250kW transmitters. The third, referred to as the Rapid-Scan DOW (RSDOW), features a custom phased-array antenna that allows for multiple elevation scans to be completed simultaneously. The RSDOW can also be configured into a single beam, single frequency, single-polarization radar (fielded as DOW 8). Each DOW is also equipped with a communication mast that hosts various weather instruments. Several instrumented mobile mesonet pickup trucks host in situ weather instrumentation on  masts to complement the remote sensing radars. These mobile mesonets also carry approximately twenty instrumented "PODS", which are ruggedized quickly deployable weather stations designed to survive inside tornadoes, tropical cyclones, and other adverse environments. The DOW fleet is sometimes accompanied by a Mobile Operations and Repair Center (MORC), a large van containing workstations for in-field coordination, data management, and equipment repair.

The DOW fleet has collected data in 200 tornadoes and inside the cores of thirteen hurricanes. DOWs have been deployed to Europe twice, for the MAP and COPS field programs, and to Alaska twice for the JAWS-Juneau projects. Three DOWs, Mobile Mesonets and PODS were deployed for the OWLeS lake-effect snow study. The DOWs have participated in many field programs including VORTEX, VORTEX2, COPS, MAP, ASCII, IHOP, SCMS, CASES, ROTATE, PAMREX, SNOWD-UNDER, FLATLAND, HERO, UIDOW, UNDEO.

The DOW fleet was deployed to the nocturnal convection study, PECAN, in June–July 2015.

In late 2018, the DOW Facility debuted a new quickly-deployable C-band radar (or COW) featuring a larger antenna and 5cm wavelength (as compared to the 3cm wavelength of the DOWs). Due to the larger size of the antenna, the truck features a built-in crane allowing for the radar to be assembled on site. The COW was first deployed as part of the RELAMPAGO field campaign in Argentina in late 2018.

In November 2020, it was announced that the Department of Atmospheric Sciences at the University of Illinois Urbana-Champaign would become the managing partner of the DOW Facility. The contract includes three DOWs, the COW, and three mobile mesonet vehicles as well as sounding systems and other instrumentation. The partnership was funded through department money and outside research grants from the NSF and other agencies. After joining UIUC, the facility and its associated instrumentation were officially renamed the "FARM" (Flexible Array of Radars and Mesonets).

FARM participated in multiple field campaigns in 2022 including WINTRE-MIX and PERiLS. It will also participate in the upcoming LEE project.

Findings 

DOW data led to the discovery of sub-kilometer hurricane boundary layer rolls, which likely modulate wind damage and may play a key role in hurricane intensification. DOW data revealed the most intense winds ever recorded (Bridge Creek tornado, 3 May 1999), and the largest tornadic circulation ever documented (also 3 May 1999 in Mulhall, OK), and made the first 3D maps of tornado winds and sub-tornadic vortex winds, and documented intense vortices within lake-effect snow bands. About 70 peer reviewed scientific publications have used DOW data.

The DOW fleet, PODS, and mobile mesonets have been featured on television, including Discovery Channel's reality series Storm Chasers, National Geographic Channel's specials Tornado Intercept and The True Face of Hurricanes, and PBS's Nova episode "The Hunt for the Supertwister," and others.

Future Instrumentation 
There are currently two major projects planned to expand the FARM's capabilities. The first is the creation of an S-band on Wheels Network (SOWNET) featuring four quickly-deployable S-band radars with 10cm wavelengths capable of seeing through intense precipitation. These smaller truck-mounted radars would replace a single large S-band radar, allowing for dual-Doppler analyses and quicker deployment times. The second planned project is the Bistatic Adaptable Radar Network (BARN) which will be integrated with existing DOWs and the COW to provide high resolution wind vector observations without the need for multiple, expensive transmitters. These bistatic receivers will consist of small antennas that can be deployed like Pods or mounted onto a Mobile Mesonet or similar vehicle.

See also
 Bistatic radar
 Pulse-Doppler radar
 Storm chasing

References

External links

 Information on Doppler on Wheels and Rapid DOW

Weather radars
Meteorology research and field projects
Severe weather and convection
Storm chasing
Bistatic radars
Science and technology in the United States